Stefan Knezevic (born 30 October 1996) is a Swiss professional footballer who plays as a centre-back for Belgian club Charleroi.

Professional career
A youth product of Luzern, Knezevic was loaned to SC Buochs for the 2014-15 season to get first team training. He made his professional debut for Luzern in a 0-0 (6-5) Swiss Cup penalty shootout win over FC Sion on 4 April 2017. He made his Swiss Super League debut in a 2-0 win over FC Vaduz on 9 April 2017. He scored his first professional goal in a 4-1 Swiss Super League loss to Grasshopper Club Zürich on 22 April 2017.

On 11 June 2021, he signed a three-year contract with Charleroi in Belgium.

Personal life
Knezevic was born in Switzerland, and is of Serbian descent.

References

External links
 SFL Profile
 
 
 Switzernald U20 profile

1996 births
Sportspeople from Lucerne
Swiss people of Serbian descent
Living people
Swiss men's footballers
Association football defenders
Switzerland youth international footballers
FC Luzern players
R. Charleroi S.C. players
Swiss Super League players
Belgian Pro League players
Swiss expatriate footballers
Expatriate footballers in Belgium
Swiss expatriate sportspeople in Belgium